Harry Evans Taylor (December 2, 1935 – January 24, 2013) was an American baseball player who played pitcher in the Major Leagues in 1957. He played for the Kansas City Athletics.

References

1935 births
Major League Baseball pitchers
Kansas City Athletics players
Texas Longhorns baseball players
Baseball players from Texas
2013 deaths
People from San Angelo, Texas